Robert David Hall (born November 9, 1947) is an American actor, best known for his role as coroner Dr. Albert Robbins, M.D. on the television show CSI: Crime Scene Investigation.

Early life
Born in East Orange, New Jersey, Hall attended Tustin High School in California and went on to graduate from UCLA in 1971 with a degree in English Literature. Hall is a former professional musician and accomplished guitarist,  and is also proficient on piano, percussion and mandolin. For several years he was a high-profile radio DJ in Los Angeles. His musical talent has been alluded to in CSI: Crime Scene Investigation several times, as his character Dr. Al Robbins would sometimes sing while performing the autopsy or with Gil Grissom when the latter came to the morgue to collect evidence. He has also done extensive voice work on television commercials and cartoons.

In 1978, Hall had to have both of his legs amputated as a result of an accident in which an 18-wheeler truck crushed his car. The accident also caused the gasoline tank of the car to explode, causing burns over 65% of his body. He now comfortably uses prosthetic limbs, allowing for personal mobility. Several of his characters, including his CSI character, have openly shared this disability. He is a prominent advocate for disabled Americans. Hall (as Dr. Robbins) mentioned once that he has prosthetic legs, but never alluded to the accident in reality.

Life and career 

In addition to starring on CSI: Crime Scene Investigation, Robert has appeared in such films as Starship Troopers and The Negotiator and has made guest appearances in a number of TV programs including The West Wing and L.A. Law.  He also furnishes the narration on CourtTV's documentary series North Mission Road. Currently, Hall is working on the short thriller "The Roymann Closure in the Netherlands", written by writer/director David Grifhorst and executive producer Jop Douma.

Hall was married to Susan Petroni from 1969 until their divorce in 1974, and Connie Cole from 1979 until their divorce in 1987. His son, Andrew, was born of his second marriage. Hall's third and current marriage is to Judy Sterns in 1999.

Filmography

Film

Television

Video games

Awards and nominations

Discography 
 2010: Things they don't teach you in school, CD album:
 Kick It To The Side Of The Road (Robert David Hall)
 Wondering Where You Are (Robert David Hall)
 Things They Don’t Teach You In School (Robert David Hall)
 It Just Is (Robert David Hall)
 (Keep On) Pushin’ It Through (Chris Wall/Robert David Hall)
 One Door Closes (Robert David Hall/Chris Wall)
 Wishes (Robert David Hall)
 For Judy (Robert David Hall)
 I Feel Like Hank Williams Tonight (Chris Wall)
 Sittin’ On Top Of The World (Lonnie Carter/Walter Jacobs)
 Ten O’Clock Train (Robert David Hall)
 Just Because (Bob Shelton, Joe Shelton, Sid Robin)

References

External links
 Robert David Hall Interview on NotableInterviews.com
 Robert David Hall Bio at CBS - CSI: Crime Scene Investigation
Interview in Ability Magazine

1947 births
American amputees
American male film actors
American male television actors
American male voice actors
Living people
Guitarists from New Jersey
Musicians from East Orange, New Jersey
20th-century American guitarists
20th-century American pianists
Amputee actors
American male pianists
21st-century American pianists
20th-century American male musicians
21st-century American male musicians